Morishige (written: 森重) is a Japanese surname. Notable people with the surname include:

, Japanese actor and comedian
, Japanese footballer
, Japanese footballer

Morishige (written: 盛重 or 守成) is also a masculine Japanese given name. Notable people with the name include:

, Japanese samurai
, Japanese samurai
, Japanese classical mandolinist

Japanese-language surnames
Japanese masculine given names